A list of thriller films released in the 1960s.

Notes

1960s
Thriller